Bintaro Jaya is a planned township located in Greater Jakarta, Indonesia. It is developed by PT Jaya Real Property Tbk (formerly PT Bintaro Jaya). The development of the township began within South Jakarta in 1979 and is expanded further to South Tangerang in Banten province. The township is built as a satellite city for Jakarta, with a total land area of about 1000 hectares. The name Bintaro is derived from the Bintaro Village, which also takes the name of Bintaro plant (Cerbera manghas), whereas Jaya came from the name of the developer.

History
Bintaro Jaya started  being developed in 1979 by PT Jaya Real Property Tbk, a subsidiary of PT Pembangunan Jaya whose majority shares are owned by the DKI Jakarta Regional Government. For 25 years, Jaya Property has been known as one of the capital's real estate companies. PT Pembangunan Jaya carries out the construction and management of housing and property projects, including Graha Raya, Puri Jaya, Plaza Bintaro Jaya, Plaza Slipi Jaya, and the Senen Trade Center block IV–V.

Bintaro Jaya was the first to introduce the concept of a "garden city" in Indonesia. 26 years later, Bintaro Jaya uses the slogan "The Professional's City" to reflect its marketing strategy as the residence of choice for Jakarta's intellectuals and professionals. It houses a variety of facilities to support the physical and social environment as designed to meet the residents' needs for comfortable housing.

Sectors and Districts

Sectors
The township is originally divided into 9 sectors. Sectors 1 and 2 of the township are located in Bintaro district of South Jakarta, whereas sectors 3 to 9 are located in Pondok Aren and Ciputat districts of South Tangerang. The central business district of Bintaro Jaya is located in Sector 7, hosting offices, malls, apartments, and retail shophouses.

Districts
In its expansion, districts are added as the developer transitions into a more cluster-based residential development. Some of the districts are named based on neighborhoods in Jakarta (Menteng, Senayan, Kebayoran).

Facilities
The township has many office buildings along with the residential clusters. There are hospitals, educational institutions, shopping malls, mosques and churches, a driving range and playground.

Educational institutions
British School Jakarta, 
Jakarta Japanese School (ジャカルタ日本人学校), 
Global Jaya School
Mentari Intercultural School Bintaro
Universitas Pembangunan Jaya
SD-SMP Pembangunan Jaya
BPK Penabur Bintaro
PKN STAN

Places of interest
Menteng Park – 30-hectare public park featuring gardens, a playground, and absorption wells
Trans Snow World Bintaro – Indoor snow sports arena with a short chairlift, offering skiing, tubing, and sledding.
Bintaro Toll Gate Garden
Bintaro Driving Range

Malls, retail, and accommodation
Bintaro Plaza
Bintaro Xchange Mall 
Lotte Mart
Bintaro Modern Market/Pasar Modern
Carrefour
Giant Hypermarket
Ace Hardware
Hero Supermarket
Electronic City
Santika Hotel
Gramedia Bookstore
Trans Park Mall Bintaro

Healthcare
Pondok Indah Bintaro Jaya Hospital
Premier Bintaro Hospital
Ihsan Medical Center
Mitra Keluarga hospital
RSIA Bina Media

Public services
 POLSEK Pondok Aren, is the district police of Pondok Aren which covers Bintaro Jaya sector 3-9. The police office is located at Jl. Graha Raya Bintaro, Perigi Baru. 
 POLSUBSEKTOR Bintaro 5, is a police station located at Jl. Bintaro Utama 5, Bintaro Jaya sector 5.
 The South Tangerang Fire and Rescue Agency (Pemadam Kebakaran Tangerang Selatan) is responsible for Bintaro Jaya area. Their contact number is 0811-900-074 and is available 24 hours.

Access 
Bintaro Jaya also has a direct access from the Ulujami-Serpong Toll Road (on the Pondok Aren exit at KM 5-6), as well as Kunciran–Serpong Toll Road (on the Parigi exit at KM 21)

Transportation
TransJakarta operates feeder routes to connect the township with Jakarta. It has shuttle bus services both for within the township and to connect other parts of Jakarta, which are known as Trans Bintaro and Intrans Bintaro Jaya respectively. Here are the list of  transportation services that serves Bintaro Jaya

Bus Routes 

 Intrans Bintaro Jaya
 Jurangmangu station–Kebayoran District
 Jurangmangu station–Emerald/Discovery District
 Jurangmangu station–Bintaro CBD
 Trans Bintaro
 Bintaro Jaya Xchange–Pondok Indah Mall–Gandaria City–FX Sudirman
 Angkot (Share Taxis)
 D10 Ciputat–Pondok Aren via Bintaro Jaya
 TransJakarta
 Royal Trans
 S31 Bintaro Jaya–Fatmawati Indomaret MRT station

Train Lines 

  KRL Commuterline Rangkasbitung Line, with three stations:
 Pondok Ranji
 Jurangmangu
 Sudimara

See also

Pondok Aren
South Tangerang
Jabodetabek

References

Populated places in Banten
Planned townships in Indonesia
Post-independence architecture of Indonesia
Regionally-owned companies of Indonesia
South Jakarta